Brothers Grimm Prize of the City of Hanau is a literary prize of Hesse. The prize, awarded by the City of Hanau, honors the Brothers Grimm, who were both born in Hanau. The prize is endowed with €10,000 and has been awarded since 1983. The ceremony takes place in November in memory of the Göttingen Seven.

Winners

 1983 Wolfgang Hilbig for Abwesenheit
 1985 Anna Mitgutsch for Die Züchtigung
 1987  for Übungen im Joch
 1989 Natascha Wodin for Einmal lebt ich
 1991 Monika Maron for Stille Zeile sechs
 1993 Harald Weinrich for Textgrammatik der deutschen Sprache
 1995 Adolf Endler for Tarzan am Prenzlauer Berg
 1997 Harry Rowohlt (for Translation)
 1999 Georg Klein for Libidissi
 2001 Heinz Czechowski for Die Zeit steht still and Das offene Geheimnis
 2003 Klaus Böldl for Die fernen Inseln
 2005 Felicitas Hoppe for Verbrecher und Versager
 2005  for Zwischen den Untergängen
 2007  for Die Erlöser AG
 2009 Natascha Wodin for Nachtgeschwister
 2011  (for Translation)
 2013 Christoph Ransmayr for Atlas eines ängstlichen Mannes
 2015 no award
 2017 Barbara Zoeke for Die Stunde der Spezialisten
 2020  for Herzklappen von Johnson & Johnson

References

External links

Literary awards of Hesse